Macy's Great American Marching Band is composed of high school music students from throughout the United States, selected by audition.

Background
The band is directed by Richard Good of Auburn University. Ward Miller, Brass Caption Head of the Blue Stars Drum & Bugle Corps, serves as Assistant Director, Doug Rosener, also from Auburn University, serves as the band's percussion director, Bart Woodley from WGI is the band's Color Guard Director, and Kailene Laga, Montclair State University, is the band's Dance Team Director. The band is hosted and coordinated by the staff of Music Festivals & Tours of Reading, PA. The group marches annually in the Macy's Thanksgiving Day Parade, occasionally behind the parade's New York City Police Department Highway Patrol motorcycle escort or before the arrival of Santa Claus' float.

In 2015, the band's 10th anniversary. In 2021, The band's 15th anniversary and invite Graduated Alumni Band.

References

High school marching bands from the United States